Oakbank School may refer to:

Oakbank School, Aberdeen, a former residential school in Aberdeen, Scotland
Oakbank School, Ryeish Green, a secondary school in Berkshire, England
Beckfoot Oakbank, a secondary school in West Yorkshire, England

See also
Oakbank (disambiguation)